Satarupa Pyne is an Indian Supermodel and Actress. Satarupa made her Bollywood debut with Madhur Bhandarkar's drama film Calendar Girls. Satarupa Pyne's  second film, was Arindam Nandi's Bengali film, Meher Aali. Currently she has appeared in a couple of successful web series and made it to a Viacom project for Voot at ‘Fuh se Fantasy’, and for Zee5 originals ‘Bhalobashar Shahor’ as a lead.

Modelling career
Satarupa is a well established ramp model. She has walked for Lakme Fashion Week, Blenders Pride, Inifd and several other designers like Dev R Nil, Sabyasachi Mukherjee and many more.

Film career 
Madhur Bhandarkar signed her as one of his five leading ladies in his film Calendar Girls.

Filmography

References

External links
 
 
 

Living people
Indian film actresses
Actresses in Hindi cinema
21st-century Indian actresses
Female models from Kolkata
1989 births